Grogen Branch is a  long 1st order tributary to the Ararat River in Patrick County, Virginia.  This is the only stream of this name in the United States.

Course
Grogen Branch rises on the south slope of Groundhog Mountain in Patrick County about 3 miles south-southwest of the peak of Groundhog Mountain.  Grogen Branch then flows south to join the Ararat River about 1 mile northwest of Ararat, Virginia.

Watershed
Grogen Branch drains  of area, receives about 51.3 in/year of precipitation, has a wetness index of 308.29, and is about 71% forested.

See also
List of rivers of Virginia

References

Rivers of Virginia
Rivers of Patrick County, Virginia